Choi Yung-keun (Hangul: 최영근, Hanja: 崔榮根; 8 February 1923 – 20 July 1994) is a South Korean football forward who played for the South Korea in the 1954 FIFA World Cup. He also played for Seoul Football Club.

References

External links
FIFA profile

1923 births
South Korean footballers
South Korea international footballers
Association football forwards
1954 FIFA World Cup players
1994 deaths